In geometry, a real projective line is a projective line over the real numbers. It is an extension of the usual concept of a line that has been historically introduced to solve a problem set by visual perspective: two parallel lines do not intersect but seem to intersect "at infinity". For solving this problem, points at infinity have been introduced, in such a way that in a real projective plane, two distinct projective lines meet in exactly one point.  The set of these points at infinity, the "horizon" of the visual perspective in the plane, is a real projective line.  It is the set of directions emanating from an observer situated at any point, with opposite directions identified.  

An example of a real projective line is the projectively extended real line, which is often called the projective line. 

Formally, a real projective line P(R) is defined as the set of all one-dimensional linear subspaces of a two-dimensional vector space over the reals. 
The automorphisms of a real projective line are called projective transformations, homographies, or linear fractional transformations. They form the projective linear group PGL(2, R). Each element of PGL(2, R) can be defined by a nonsingular 2×2 real matrix, and two matrices define the same element of PGL(2, R) if one is the product of the other and a nonzero real number.

Topologically, real projective lines are homeomorphic to circles. The complex analog of a real projective line is a complex projective line; that is, a Riemann sphere.

Definition

The points of the real projective line are usually defined as equivalence classes of an equivalence relation. The starting point is a real vector space of dimension 2, . Define on  the binary relation  to hold when there exists a nonzero real number  such that . The definition of a vector space implies almost immediately that this is an equivalence relation. The equivalence classes are the vector lines from which the zero vector has been removed. The real projective line  is the set of all equivalence classes. Each equivalence class is considered as a single point, or, in other words, a point is defined as being an equivalence class.

The equivalence class of the pair  is traditionally denoted , the colon in the notation recalling that, if , the ratio  is the same for all elements of the equivalence class.

However, the fact that equivalence classes are not finite induces some difficulties for defining the differential structure. These are solved by considering  as a Euclidean vector space. This circle intersects each equivalence classes in exactly two opposite points.

Charts
The projective line is a manifold. This can be seen by above construction through an equivalence relation, but is easier to understand by providing an atlas consisting of two charts
 Chart #1:  
 Chart #2:  
The equivalence relation provides that all representatives of an equivalence class are sent to the same real number by a chart.

The transition map between these two charts is the multiplicative inverse. As it is a differentiable function, and even an analytic function (outside of zero), the real projective line is both a differentiable manifold and an analytic manifold.

The inverse function of chart #1 is the map

It defines an embedding of the real line into the projective line, whose complement of the image is the point . The pair consisting of this embedding and the projective line is called the projectively extended real line. Identifying the real line with its image by this embedding, one sees that the projective line may be considered as the union of the real line and the single point , called the point at infinity of the projectively extended real line, and denoted .

The same construction may be done with the other chart. This shows that the notion of point at infinity is not intrinsic to the real projective line, but is relative to the choice of an embedding of the real line into the projective line.

Structure
The real projective line is a complete projective range that is found in the real projective plane and in the complex projective line. Its structure is thus inherited from these superstructures. Primary among these structures is the relation of projective harmonic conjugates among the points of the projective range.

The real projective line has a cyclic order that extends the usual order of the real numbers.

Automorphisms

The projective linear group and its action

(Here and below, the notation  for homogeneous coordinates denotes the equivalence class of the column matrix  it must not be confused with the row matrix )

The projective linear group is defined to be the quotient group .

Linear fractional transformations
 

Properties

Notes

References
 Juan Carlos Alvarez (2000)  The Real Projective Line, course content from New York University.
 Santiago Cañez (2014) Notes on Projective Geometry from Northwestern University.

Projective geometry
Manifolds